Nikitinskaya is a rural locality (a village) in Vozhbalskoye Rural Settlement, Totemsky  District, Vologda Oblast, Russia. The population was 2 as of 2002.

Geography 
Nikitinskaya is located 71 km northwest of Totma (the district's administrative centre) by road. Ilyukhinskaya is the nearest rural locality.

References 

Rural localities in Totemsky District